Oxprenoic acid, or oxprenoate, is a synthetic steroidal antimineralocorticoid which was never marketed.

See also
 Oxprenoate potassium

References

Antimineralocorticoids
Carboxylic acids
Ketones
Pregnanes
Spirolactones
Tertiary alcohols